1938 Egypt Cup Final, was the final match of 1937–38 Egypt Cup, between Zamalek SC (El-Mokhtalat) & Al-Ahly, with the game ending 1–1 meant the two sides could not be separated, so a replay was played during the following season, the replay game ends 1–0, Zamalek SC won the cup for the 4th time.

Route to the final

Game description

Match details

Replay

References 
 http://www.angelfire.com/ak/EgyptianSports/ZamVsAhlyCUP1938.html

1938
EC 1938
Al Ahly SC matches